Derek Mason (born September 29, 1969) is an American college football coach. Mason served as the head football coach at Vanderbilt University from 2014 until midway through the 2020 season.

Early life and playing career
Mason attended Camelback High School in Phoenix, Arizona. After graduating from high school, he attended Northern Arizona University from 1989 to 1992, where he was a four-year letterman and two-year starter at cornerback.

Coaching career
After his playing career ended, Mason coached college football at Mesa Community College, Weber State, Bucknell, Utah, St. Mary's, New Mexico State, and Ohio. From 2007 to 2009, he coached defensive backs for the Minnesota Vikings of the NFL under Brad Childress, who had been one of his coaches at Northern Arizona.

Stanford
In 2010, Mason was hired as defensive backs coach on Jim Harbaugh's staff at Stanford. In 2011, Mason was promoted to associate head coach and co-defensive coordinator under new head coach David Shaw. In 2012, Mason became the sole defensive coordinator for the Cardinal and was a finalist for the Broyles Award, given annually to the top assistant coach in college football. In 2013, the defensive coordinator position was endowed and named the Willie Shaw Director of Defense.

Vanderbilt
On January 17, 2014, Vanderbilt hired Mason as its new head football coach, succeeding James Franklin. With the hire, Vanderbilt is the first and only school in the Southeastern Conference (SEC) to have multiple minority head football coaches in its history. After back–to–back home losses, Mason won his first game as head coach against UMass by a score of 34–31. Vanderbilt had been outscored 10–78 in the two games prior to the win. The Commodores struggled offensively for much of the season. Vanderbilt did not score an offensive touchdown for nine quarters and was the last Division I team to reach the end zone on offense.

After a disappointing first season in Nashville, Mason fired both his offensive and defensive coordinators. He hired Andy Ludwig, formerly the offensive coordinator at Wisconsin, to run the offense. Mason decided to call the defensive plays himself.

His second season saw moderate growth for Vanderbilt, culminating in a 4–8 record with numerous firsts for the young head coach. Mason earned his first win against an SEC opponent (against Missouri) and his first win while on the road (at Middle Tennessee State University). The team was praised for a nationally respected defensive scheme, but the Commodores were unable to perform equally well with their offensive or special team capabilities.

Mason continued his role as head coach and defensive coordinator in his third season at Vanderbilt, leading the Commodores to a 6–6 (3–5 SEC) record in 2016, earning bowl eligibility for the first time as a head coach. Mason won his first SEC road game on October 15 at Georgia by the final score of 17–16. The Commodores nearly picked up another road win against a ranked conference opponent on November 5 at Auburn, losing 23–16 after throwing a late interception at the opponents' 30 yard line in the final minute.

After a disappointing loss to Missouri the next week, the Commodores needed to beat both Ole Miss and Tennessee at home in the team's final two games of the season to assure themselves of bowl eligibility, though they would have still reached a bowl with a 5–7 record based on a high Academic Performance Rating (APR), which determines the bowl eligibility of five win teams for open bowl slots. APR became a non-factor as the Commodores upset both Ole Miss and Tennessee at home in back-to-back games to end the regular season with a 6–6 record on the strength of 3 conference wins. Vandy scored a combined 83 points in the two wins as the offense came alive late in the season. Mason's dancing on the sideline and post-game celebration after defeating Tennessee were widely shared on Twitter and ESPN.

Under Mason, redshirt junior linebacker Zach Cunningham became a national finalist for the Butkus Award, given to the nation's best collegiate linebacker.

Year four for Mason was a disappointing regression. Despite an historic 3–0 start, including defeating a then 18th ranked Kansas State at home in week 3 and ending a five-year losing streak of opening games since 2012, the Commodores finished 5–7 and were unable to play in a bowl game despite APR. Derek Mason was unable to answer the Alabama Crimson Tide in week 4, and experienced a five-game losing streak until hosting Western Kentucky in week 10. However, despite their lackluster performance, Vanderbilt was able to defeat the University of Tennessee, ensuring the Volunteers first ever 8 loss season.

The 2018 season began with Mason considered on the hot seat, one of 10 coaches identified by ESPN to be facing this challenge. He is the first Vanderbilt football coach to beat the Tennessee Volunteers three years in a row since Dan McGugin did it in 1926, 1925, and 1924.

Mason helped the program make history in 2020 by introducing Sarah Fuller, the school's women's soccer goalkeeper, into a November 28 game against Missouri. Fuller was the first woman to play in a game for a Power Five conference team, kicking off the second half, although Fuller never got a chance to kick a field goal or an extra point that day with Vanderbilt falling to Missouri 41–0 and 0–8 on the season.  Fuller's appearance was not enough to offset seven consecutive seasons with a losing record, and the next day Mason was fired. (Fuller did convert two extra points during her next appearance, at home against Tennessee on December 12.)

Auburn
On January 7, 2021, Mason was hired as the Auburn Tigers’ defensive coordinator.

Oklahoma State

On January 26, 2022, it was announced that Mason was hired as the next defensive coordinator for the Oklahoma State Cowboys after the departure of previous defensive coordinator Jim Knowles.

Personal life
Mason and his wife, LeighAnne, have two daughters, Sydney and Makenzie. Makenzie was a lacrosse player for the University of Florida.

Mason is a member of Kappa Alpha Psi fraternity.

Head coaching record

*Fired after 8 games.

References

External links
 Oklahoma State profile

1969 births
Living people
American football cornerbacks
Bucknell Bison football coaches
Minnesota Vikings coaches
New Mexico State Aggies football coaches
Northern Arizona Lumberjacks football players
Ohio Bobcats football coaches
Oklahoma State Cowboys football coaches
Saint Mary's Gaels football coaches
Stanford Cardinal football coaches
Utah Utes football coaches
Idaho State Bengals football coaches
Vanderbilt Commodores football coaches
Weber State Wildcats football coaches
Junior college football coaches in the United States
Players of American football from Phoenix, Arizona
Coaches of American football from Arizona
African-American coaches of American football
African-American players of American football
20th-century African-American sportspeople
21st-century African-American sportspeople